Prad am Stilfser Joch, often abbreviated to Prad, is a comune (municipality) in South Tyrol in northern Italy, located about  west of the city of Bolzano, on the border with Switzerland, and near the Stelvio Pass.

Geography

The municipality of Prad contains the frazione (subdivision) Lichtenberg (Montechiaro).

Prad borders the following municipalities: Glurns, Laas, Schluderns, Stilfs, Taufers im Münstertal and Müstair (Switzerland).

History

Coat-of-arms
The emblem shows three or ears of wheat, in a gules field  on azure. The bottom is red. The wheat symbolizes the importance played by the cereal growing in the municipality. The emblem was adopted in 1969.

Society

Linguistic distribution
According to the 2011 census, 97.21% of the population speak German, 2.73% Italian and 0.06% Ladin as first language.

Demographic evolution

Sport

Notable people
 Gustav Thöni, alpine ski racer

References

External links

 Homepage of the municipality

Municipalities of South Tyrol